Fates and Furies may refer to:

 Fates and Furies (novel), a novel by  Lauren Groff
 Fates & Furies (TV series), a 2018 South Korean TV series